Eupithecia edna is a moth in the family Geometridae first described by George Duryea Hulst in 1896. It is found in the southernwestern United States, including Arizona, California, Colorado, Nevada and New Mexico.

The wingspan is about 17–22 mm. Adults have been recorded on wing from May to September.

References

Moths described in 1896
edna
Moths of North America